Events from the year 1920 in Czechoslovakia. The year saw the state adopt a new constitution and hold its first parliamentary elections.

Incumbents
President: Tomáš Masaryk.
Prime Minister:
Vlastimil Tusar (until 15 September).
 Jan Černý (from 15 September).

Events
29 February – A new constitution is adopted with the president elected by a National Assembly. The constitution also rules that the country been known as Czechoslovakia, ending the hyphen war.
18 April – Elections are held for the Chamber of Deputies of the National Assembly.
23 April – The Czechoslovakian team participates for the first time in the Summer Olympics.
25 April – Elections are held for the Senate.
29 April – The Czechoslovakian ice hockey team wins the first Olympic bronze medal, in ice hockey.
27 May – Tomáš Masaryk is re-elected president.
4 June – The Treaty of Trianon is signed, confirming that Carpathian Ruthenia is part of Czechoslovakia.
28 July – Czechoslovakia and Poland agree their border around Český Těšín.
14 August – An alliance is signed between Czechoslovakia and Yugoslavia.

Popular culture

Film
Gilly in Prague for the First Time (directed by Karel Lamač, is released.
For the Freedom of the Nation, directed by Václav Binovec, is released.

Music
Bohuslav Martinů composes Three Slovak Songs.
Leoš Janáček's Káťa Kabanová and The Excursions of Mr. Brouček to the Moon and to the 15th Century are first performed.
The Prague Quartet is founded.

Births
5 April Aniela Kupiec, Polish poet born in Cieszyn Silesia (died 2019).
23 August – Wanda Jablonski, investigative reporter of the petroleum industry (died 1992).
12 September – Lore Schirmer, Kabarett artist and standup comedian (died 1994).
3 November – Herta Lindner, member of the German resistance to Nazism (died 1943).
21 December – Olga Šilhánová, gymnast, gold medal winner at the 1948 Summer Olympics (died 1986).

Deaths
1 May – Hanuš Wihan, cellist (born 1855).
6 December – Karel Kovařovic, composer and conductor (born 1862).

References

Citations

Bibliography

Czechoslovakia
1920 in Czechoslovakia
Czechoslovakia
1920s in Czechoslovakia
Years of the 20th century in Czechoslovakia